This is a list of butterflies of Oman. About 53 species are known from Oman.

Papilionidae

Papilioninae

Papilionini
Papilio machaon muetingi  Seyer, 1976
Papilio demoleus  Linnaeus, 1758

Pieridae

Pierinae
Colotis antevippe zera (Lucas, 1852)
Colotis daira (Klug, 1829)
Colotis eris contractus  Gabriel, 1954
Pinacopterix eriphia tritogenia (Klug, 1829)
Euchloe charlonia amseli  Gross & Ebert, 1975

Pierini
Pieris krueperi  Staudinger, 1860

Lycaenidae

Aphnaeinae
Chloroselas esmeralda bilqis  Larsen, 1983
Cigaritis myrmecophila  Dumont, 1922
Cigaritis scotti (Gabriel, 1954)
Axiocerses harpax kadugli  Talbot, 1935

Theclinae
Myrina silenus nzoiae  d'Abrera, 1980
Iolaus glaucus  Butler, 1886
Deudorix livia livia (Klug, 1834)
Deudorix livia barnetti  Libert, 2005

Polyommatinae

Lycaenesthini
Anthene amarah (Guérin-Méneville, 1849)

Polyommatini
Cacyreus virilis  Stempffer, 1936
Leptotes pirithous (Linnaeus, 1767)
Tarucus balkanicus (Freyer, 1843)
Tarucus rosacea (Austaut, 1885)
Tarucus theophrastus (Fabricius, 1793)
Zizeeria karsandra (Moore, 1865)
Zizula hylax (Fabricius, 1775)
Azanus moriqua (Wallengren, 1857)
Azanus ubaldus (Stoll, 1782)
Pseudophilotes vicrama clara (Christoph, 1887)
Euchrysops lois (Butler, 1886)
Euchrysops osiris (Hopffer, 1855)
Chilades parrhasius (Fabricius, 1793)
Plebejidea loewii uranicola (Walker, 1870)

Nymphalidae

Danainae

Danaini
Danaus chrysippus alcippus (Cramer, 1777)

Satyrinae

Melanitini
Melanitis leda (Linnaeus, 1758)

Satyrini
Ypthima asterope (Klug, 1832)
Ypthima bolanica  Marshall, 1883
Hipparchia parisatis (Kollar, 1849)

Charaxinae

Charaxini
Charaxes varanes bertrami  Riley, 1931
Charaxes hansali arabica  Riley, 1931

Nymphalinae

Nymphalini
Hypolimnas bolina jacintha (Drury, [1773])
Hypolimnas misippus (Linnaeus, 1764)
Melitaea deserticola scotti  Higgins, 1941

Biblidinae

Biblidini
Byblia ilithyia (Drury, 1773)

Heliconiinae

Acraeini
Acraea neobule  Doubleday, 1847

Hesperiidae

Coeliadinae
Coeliades anchises jucunda (Butler, 1881)

Pyrginae

Celaenorrhinini
Sarangesa phidyle (Walker, 1870)

Carcharodini
Spialia colotes semiconfluens  de Jong, 1978
Spialia doris (Walker, 1870)
Spialia mafa higginsi  Evans, 1937
Spialia mangana (Rebel, 1899)
Spialia zebra bifida (Higgins, 1924)
Gomalia elma (Trimen, 1862)

Hesperiinae

Baorini
Gegenes nostrodamus (Fabricius, 1793)
Gegenes pumilio (Hoffmansegg, 1804)

References

Lists of butterflies by location
Butterflies
Butterflies by country
O

Butterflies